Keratobrachyops is an extinct genus of trematosaurian temnospondyl found in the Arcadia Formation of Queensland, Australia. It had been thought to be a basal chigutisaurid but is now thought to be a basal brachyopomorph closely related to the genus Bothriceps, and may even be a synonym of it.

See also 
 Prehistoric amphibian
 List of prehistoric amphibians

References 

Chigutisaurids
Induan life
Triassic temnospondyls of Australia
Paleontology in Queensland
Fossil taxa described in 1981